Găgești is a commune in Vaslui County, Western Moldavia, Romania. It is composed of five villages: Găgești, Giurcani, Peicani, Popeni and Tupilați.

References

Communes in Vaslui County
Localities in Western Moldavia